The Gryfits, also known as Świebodzits, was a medieval Polish knightly family. They occupied a dominant position among the nobles of Lesser Poland in the 12th and 13th century.

History
The family name comes from the emblem Gryf (a Griffin) of their coat of arms. In particular for the period before the 14th century they are also called Świebodzice, because of their battle cry: Świeboda, (freedom, liberty). Jan Długosz connected the family with the House of Griffins. According to some historians, the Gryfici family, the House of Griffins and the House of Sobiesław are descendants of a branch of the Piast dynasty and their progenitor was one of the younger brothers of Bolesław the Brave - Świętopełk.

Notable members
 Jaksa z Miechowa (died 1176) – crusader, możnowładca (magnate) in Lesser Poland (according to some historians he is the same person as Jaxa of Köpenick, Prince of the Sprevane), son-in-law of Piotr Włostowic
 Janik (died after 1167) – Bishop of Gniezno
 Mikołaj (died 1202) –  Voivode of Kraków, commander of the forces of Lesser Poland at the Battle of Mozgawa
  (died 1230/1231) – Voivode of Kraków
 Teodor (died 1237) – Voivode of Kraków
 Klemens z Brzeźnicy (died 1241) – castellan of Kraków, died at the Battle of Chmielnik
 Jan Klimontowic (died after 1243) – castellan of Cieszyn  and Toszek
 Andrzej z Brzeźnicy (died 1244) – Bishop of Płock
 Klemens z Ruszczy (died 1256) – castellan and Voivode of Kraków, closest associate of Bolesław V the Chaste
 Wierzbięta z Ruszczy (died after 1310) – castellan and Voivode of Kraków
 Wierzbięta z Branic (died 1424) – Stolnik of Kraków

Branches
 House of Branicki
 House of Mielecki

See also
 Gryf coat of arms

Bibliography
 A. Małecki, Studya heraldyczne, t. I, Lwów 1890, pp. 268-285, t. II, Lwów 1890, pp. 46-67
 L. M. Wójcik, Ród Gryfitów do końca XIII wieku. Pochodzenie — genealogia — rozsiedlenie, "Historia" CVII, Wrocław 1993.

References